Peratosauroides is an extinct genus of prehistoric salamander.

See also
 List of prehistoric amphibian genera

References

Prehistoric salamanders
Fossil taxa described in 1980
Prehistoric amphibian genera